Rudy: The Rudy Giuliani Story is an American television film produced and broadcast in 2003 on the USA Network. The movie stars James Woods as former New York City mayor Rudy Giuliani and depicts the life of Giuliani, focusing primarily on his mayoral career and response to the September 11 attacks.

The film was based on the 2000 biography Rudy!: An Investigative Biography of Rudy Giuliani by Wayne Barrett. 
It has been broadcast in several countries.

Cast
 James Woods as Rudy Giuliani
 Penelope Ann Miller as Donna Hanover 
 Michelle Nolden as Cristyne Lategano
 Philip Spensley as Howard Safer
 Jack Langedijk as William Bratton
 John Bourgeois as Peter Powers
 Kirsten Bishopric as Judith Nathan
 Mark Camacho as Tony Carbonetti
 Maxim Roy as Beth Petrone

The real Rudy Giuliani makes a cameo in the film as a construction worker.

Reception

John Leonard of New York Magazine gave it a negative review and wrote: "Rudy seems to suggest that such passionate mood swings are nothing more than lint in the navel and wax in the ears of a Great Man being grandly operatic."

MaryAnn Johanson of Flick Filosopher thought the film came too soon after September 11, 2001 for real perspective and said the film "suffers from a shallowness and a rushed kind of hagiography".

In November 2020, thousands of social media users rediscovered the film and began mocking it, both for its poor quality and in light of Giuliani's career since its release.

In a 2006 interview with PARADE, Woods reported that Giuliani met with him after the network premiere and praised his performance in the film.

Awards and nominations
Emmy Awards
 2003: Nominated, "Outstanding Lead Actor in a Miniseries or a Movie" - James Woods
 2003: Nominated, "Outstanding Makeup for a Miniseries, Movie or a Special (Non-Prosthetic)" - Jocelyne Bellemare, Stephan Dupuis, Cécile Rigault, Matthew W. Mungle

Satellite Awards
 2004: Won, "Best Motion Picture Made for Television" 
 2004: Won, "Best Performance by an Actor in a Miniseries or a Motion Picture Made for Television" - James Woods

Writers Guild of America Awards
 2004: Nominated, "Adapted Long Form" - Stanley Weiser

References

External links
 
 

2003 television films
2003 films
2003 biographical drama films
American biographical drama films
Biographical films about politicians
Films scored by Harald Kloser
Films based on the September 11 attacks
Rudy Giuliani
USA Network original films
Cultural depictions of politicians
Cultural depictions of American men
American drama television films
Films directed by Robert Dornhelm
2000s English-language films
2000s American films